The men's flyweight event was part of the boxing programme at the 1984 Summer Olympics. The weight class allowed boxers of up to 51 kilograms to compete. The competition was held from 31 July to 11 August 1984. 31 boxers from 31 nations competed.

Medalists

Results
The following boxers took part in the event:

First round
 Peter Ayesu (MLW) def. Prabin Tuladhar (NEP), 5:0
 Oppe Pinto (PAR) def. Andrew Seymour (BAH), 5:0
 Steve McCrory (USA) def. Tad Joseph (GRN), walk-over
 Fausto Garcia (MEX) def. John Kakooza (UGA), 5:0
 Huh Yong-Mo (KOR) def. Fayek Gobran (EGY), RSC-1
 Efreen Tabanas (PHI) def. Hen Chin Ming (TPE), KO-2
 Seiki Segawa (JPN) def. Junior Ward (GUY), KO-2
 Eyüp Can (TUR) def. Bill Dunlop (CAN), 5:0
 David Mwaba (TNZ) def. Chibou Amna (NIG), 5:0
 Jeff Fenech (AUS) def. René Centellas (BOL), RSC-3
 Pat Clinton (GBR) def. Leonard Makhanya (SWZ), 5:0
 Redzep Redzepovski (YUG) def. Sanguo Teraporn (THA), 3:2
 Ibrahim Bilali (KEN) def. Patrick Mwamba (ZAM), 3:2
 Alvaro Mercado (COL) def. Julio Gómez (ESP), 4:1
 Laureano Ramírez (DOM) def. Oscar Carballo (ARG), RSC-2
 José Rodríguez (PUR) def. Lutuma Diabateza (ZAI), 5:0

Second round
 Peter Ayesu (MLW) def. Oppe Pinto (PAR), 5:0
 Steve McCrory (USA) def. Fausto Garcia (MEX), RSC-1
 Huh Yong-Mo (KOR) def. Efreen Tabanas (PHI), 4:1
 Eyüp Can (TUR) def. Seiki Segawa (JPN), 4:1
 Jeff Fenech (AUS) def. David Mwaba (TNZ), 5:0
 Redzep Redzepovski (YUG) def. Pat Clinton (GBR), KO-2
 Ibrahim Bilali (KEN) def. Alvaro Mercado (COL), 4:1
 Laureano Ramírez (DOM) def. José Rodríguez (PUR), 5:0

Quarterfinals
 Steve McCrory (USA) def. Peter Ayesu (MLW), 5:0
 Eyüp Can (TUR) def. Huh Yong-Mo (KOR), 4:1
 Redzep Redzepovski (YUG) def. Jeff Fenech (AUS), 4:1
 Ibrahim Bilali (KEN) def. Laureano Ramírez (DOM), 5:0

Semifinals
 Steve McCrory (USA) def. Eyüp Can (TUR), 5:0
 Redzep Redzepovski (YUG) def. Ibrahim Bilali (KEN), 5:0

Final
 Steve McCrory (USA) def. Redzep Redzepovski (YUG), 4:1

References

Flyweight